Aspergillus fructiculosus (also known as Emericella fruticulosa, Aspergillus fruticans) is a species of fungus in the genus Aspergillus. The species was first described in 1965. It has been reported to produce sterigmatocystin.

References 

fructiculosus
Fungi described in 1965